After the division of Germany in 1949, West Germany was declared Germany's official successor team. East Germany was accepted as a FIFA member only in 1952 and entered the qualification tournament for the first time for 1958, but finished last in their qualification group behind Czechoslovakia and Wales.

They appeared in the finals of the FIFA World Cup on one occasion in 1974. During the tournament they played West Germany, who were hosts in that year, for the first and only time at senior level, winning 1–0. East Germany was reunified with West Germany in 1990 and did not compete again after the 1990 World Cup.

Record at the FIFA World Cup

*Draws include knockout matches decided on penalty kicks

By match

Record by opponent

East Germany at 1974 World Cup

First Round, Group 1

Second Round, Group A

Record players

Top goalscorers

 
Countries at the FIFA World Cup
World Cup